Blair Morgan (Born October 9, 1975) is a multi-time CMRC Canadian National championship-winning motocross racer who was racing for Ski-Doo Racing. He is also a multi-time World Snocross snowmobile champion and a 5-time X-Games gold medalist. He has made several comebacks from devastating injuries and is credited with pioneering the modern snocross riding style.

Blair Morgan won 89 National events and 13 points in championships. In 2013, he was inducted into the Snowmobile Hall of Fame, which credited him with popularizing "the stand-up style of racing that revolutionized both snocross and the entire sport."

Motocross

Morgan started racing in his early teens in his home province of Saskatchewan. He progressed through to the ranks of Pro, and made his debut on the Canadian National scene in 1993 at Walton Raceway's TransCan GNC. In 1997 he competed in the Nationals as a member of Two Wheel Kawasaki. He won the 250 title the next year but lost the overall crown to Dube. He would regain the number one plate in 1999. 2000 marked a year of significant growth for the Canadian Nationals, and Morgan switched to the Blackfoot Honda team. Injury held him to a #7 ranking for the year, but he rebounded in 2001 and battled Jean Sebastien Roy throughout the year. Morgan scored more wins, but the title went to the Quebecer. Morgan won the four-stroke class at the US Open of Supercross that fall, the first win for the Honda CRF450R. In 2002 Morgan again ended with the #2 plate. He started his own Yamaha team for 2003, but an accident at Nanaimo, British Columbia, ruined his season. A series of nagging injuries from both motocross and snocross affected him for the next few years. In 2006, Morgan returned to form with Blackfoot Honda and scored multiple podiums to finish the year 3rd overall behind Dusty Klatt and Roy. On September 21, 2008, Morgan severed his spine while practising on a course that was to be his last before switching to sno-cross. He was paralyzed from the middle of the back down. The Canadian Motocross Des Nations Team dedicated the year's MXDN race to Morgan.

Snocross

Morgan started racing snocross for Arctic Cat full-time in 1997. His stand-up, high-flying and aggressive motocross style revolutionized the sport. He claimed most of the race wins and championships for the next several seasons. During the 2001–2002 season, Morgan switched to Ski-Doo until, in 2003, motocross injuries derailed further title hopes. He raced again in 2004 and was injured in 2005. In June 2008, it was reported that Morgan was "looking for a new ride", making him a free agent.

Return to racing
In 2018, Morgan returned to competitive racing in the Adaptive Snowbike class.

Career titles
1999 CMRC National Motocross Champion
1997 CMRC National Motocross Champion
1998 CMRC 250 National Champion
5 X-Games Gold Medals (Snocross)
Multi-time Snocross World Championships and race wins

References

1975 births
Canadian motocross riders
Living people
Sportspeople from Prince Albert, Saskatchewan
X Games athletes
Snowmobile racers